John mac Richard Mór Burke, 10th Clanricarde or Mac William Uachtar (died 1536), was an Irish chieftain and noble.

Background
Burke was a son of Ricard mac Edmund Burke of Roscam, County Galway (died c.1517), a grandson of Edmund Burke (d.1466), and great-grandson of Ulick Ruadh Burke, 5th Clanricarde (d.1485). 

John mac Ricard succeeded his father's cousin, Richard Mór Burke, 9th Clanricarde (d.1530) as chieftain in 1530. Six years later, John was succeeded by the latter's younger brother, Richard Bacach Burke, 11th Clanricarde (d.1538).

Family tree

   Ulick Ruadh Burke, d. 1485
    |
    |
    |                      |                        |                        |                 |
    |                      |                        |                        |                 |
    Edmund, d. 1486.       Ulick Fionn          Meiler, Abbot of Tuam      John, d. 1508.   Ricard Og, d. 1519.
    |                      |                                                                   |
    |                      |___            |_
    Ricard, d. c. 1517.    |                          |              |            |            |                |
    |                      |                          |              |            |            |                |
    |                      Ulick Óge, d. 1519.    Richard Mór   Redmond    Richard Bacach    Ulick, d. 1551.  Thomas
    John, fl. 1536.                                   |                           |            |                |
                                                      |                           |            |                |
                                                 Ulick na gCeann         Roland, Bp. Clonfert. Thomas Balbh  John of Derrymaclaghtna
                                                      |                         died 1580                       |
                           ___|_                            |
                           |                    |     |               |             |                       Ricard, d. 1593.
                           |                    |     |               |             |                           |
                          Richard Sassanach   John  Thomas Feranta  Edmond   Redmond na Scuab         (Burke of Derrymaclaghtna)
                           | d. 1582.                 d. 1546.                  d. 1596.
                           |
                       Earls of Clanricarde         

 Richard an Fhorbhair de Burgh (d.1343)
 Sir William (Ulick) de Burgh (d. 1343/53), 1st Mac William Uachtar (Upper Mac William) or Clanricarde (Galway)
 Richard Óg Burke (d. 1387), 2nd Clanricarde
 Ulick an Fhiona Burke (d. 1424), 3rd Clanricarde
 Ulick Ruadh Burke (d. 1485), 5th Clanricarde
 Edmund Burke (d. 1466)
 Ricard of Roscam (d. 1517)
 John mac Richard Mór Burke (d. 1536), 10th Clanricarde
 Ulick Fionn Burke (d.1509), 6th Clanricarde
 Ulick Óge Burke (d. 1520), 8th Clanricarde
 Richard Mór Burke (d. 1530), 9th Clanricarde
 Ulick na gCeann Burke (d. 1544), 12th Clanricarde, 1st Earl of Clanricarde (1543)
 Richard Bacach Burke (d. 1538), 11th Clanricarde
 Richard Óge Burke (d. 1519), 7th Clanricarde
 Sir Uilleag Burke (d. 1551), 13th Clanricarde
 William mac Ulick Burke (d. 1430), 4th Clanricarde
 Edmund de Burgh (d. 1410)

Annalistic reference
M1536.18. The sons of Mac William of Clanrickard, John Duv and Redmond Roe, the two sons of Rickard, son of Ulick, were slain by the sons of the other Mac William, namely, the sons of Rickard Oge, they being overtaken in a pursuit, after they had gathered the preys of the country.

References

Further reading
Burke, Eamon "Burke People and Places", Dublin, 1995.
A New History of Ireland, IX, p. 172, Oxford, 1984.

16th-century Irish people
1536 deaths
Year of birth unknown
People from County Galway
John Mac Richard Mor